R. Thamaraiselvan was an Indian politician and Ex member of the Parliament of India from Dharmapuri Constituency. He represents the Dravida Munnetra Kazhagam party. He was a successful Senior Advocate from Madras High Court and represents various cases in Apex Courts. He was born to Shri L.P. Ramar and Smt.Pachiammal and is married to Smt.Geetha, who is also a practicing Advocate from Madras High Court for more than two decades.  Though, he hails from a traditional DMK family tracing back from Justice Party, he was an acclaimed Counsel on Record and a Full time Politician of DMK party.

References 

Living people
India MPs 2009–2014
Dravida Munnetra Kazhagam politicians
Lok Sabha members from Tamil Nadu
People from Dharmapuri district
Year of birth missing (living people)